Sultan Ahmed Mirza was the eldest son of Abu Sa'id Mirza on whose death he became the Timurid ruler of Samarkand and Bukhara from 1469 until 1494. During his rule, he successfully repelled at least one invasion attempt by the Kara Koyunlu, and failed in an attempt to conquer Khurasan from its ruler Sultan Husayn Mirza Bayqara. He was embroiled in the Timurid Civil Wars with his brothers Umar Shaikh Mirza II and Sultan Mahmud Mirza. He died while returning from his Ferghana expedition against Babur, the twelve-year-old son and successor of Umar Shaikh Mirza II. As he had no male heir, he was succeeded by his brother, Sultan Mahmud Mirza.

Family
Consorts
Ahmed had six consorts:
Mihr Nigar Khanum, daughter of Yunus Khan of Moghulistan and Aisan Daulat Begum;
Terkhan Begum, of the family of Terkhans;
Qatak Begum, foster sister of Terkhan Begum;
Khanzada Begum, sprung of the khans of Termez;
Latif Begum, daughter of Ahmed Haji Beg;
Habiba Sultan Begum, daughter of Sultan Arghun.

Sons
Two sons who died in infancy - mothers unknown;

Daughters
Ahmed had five daughters, four of them born to Qatak Begum:
Rabia Sultan Begum known as Karaguz Begum - with Qatak Begum, married firstly to Sultan Mahmud Khan, married secondly to Jani Beg Sultan Uzbek;
Salika Sultan Begum known as Ak Begum - with Qatak Begum, married to Sultan Masud Mirza, son of Sultan Mahmud Mirza;
Aisha Sultan Begum - with Qatak Begum, married to Babur;
Sultanum Begum - with Qatak Begum, married firstly to Sultan Ali Mirza, son of Sultan Mahmud Mirza, secondly to Temur Sultan, son of Muhammad Shaybani, married thirdly to Mehdi Sultan;
Masuma Sultan Begum - with Habiba Sultan Begum, married to Babur;

Ancestry 

Timurid monarchs
15th-century monarchs in Asia
1451 births
1494 deaths